The Scottish Government Economy Directorates are a group of Directorates of the Scottish Government. They were rebranded as the Economy Directorates in July 2016, having previously been reorganised in December 2010 and then in June 2014. In July 2021, a further re-organisation led to the creation of the Net Zero Directorates, with Agriculture & Rural Economy, Marine Scotland, Energy & Climate Change, Environment & Forestry, Transport Scotland, Forestry and Land Scotland and Scottish Forestry moving to the new Directorate General.

The individual Directorates within the DG (Director-General) Economy family (the Economy Directorates) report to the Director-General, Elinor Mitchell.

Ministers 
There is no direct relationship between Ministers and the Directorates. However, the activities of the Directorates include those under the purview of the Deputy First Minister and Cabinet Secretary for Covid Recovery, John Swinney MSP, the Cabinet Secretary for Finance and the Economy, Kate Forbes MSP and the Cabinet Secretary for Net Zero, Energy and Transport, Michael Matheson MSP. They are supported in their work by the Minister for Business, Trade, Tourism and Enterprise, the Minister for Just Transition, Employment and Fair Work, the Minister for Public Finance, Planning and Community Wealth and the Minister for Environment, Biodiversity and Land Reform.

Directorates
The Directorates were previously the Enterprise, Environment and Innovation Directorates, reorganised in July 2016.

The overarching Scottish Government Directorates were preceded by similar structures called "Departments" that no longer exist (although the word is still sometimes erroneously used in this context). As an overarching unit, the  Economy Directorates incorporate a number of individual Directorates entitled:

  Chief Economist Directorate
  COVID Business Resilience and Support 
  Culture, Tourism and Major Events Directorate
  Economic Development Directorate
  Fair Work, Employability and Skills Directorate
  International Trade and Investment Directorate
  Scottish Development International

Agencies and other bodies
The Directorates were formerly responsible for two agencies, but responsibility has passed to the Net Zero Directorates:
 Forestry and Land Scotland
 Scottish Forestry

The Directorates also formerly sponsored several non-departmental public bodies - most responsibilities have passed to the Net Zero Directorates: 
 Cairngorms National Park Authority
 Crofters Commission
 Loch Lomond and the Trossachs National Park Authority
 James Hutton Institute
 Royal Botanic Garden Edinburgh
 Scottish Environment Protection Agency
 NatureScot

History
Prior to the creation of the Enterprise, Environment and Innovation Directorates in June 2014, the group was known as the Enterprise, Environment and Digital Directorates from December 2010.  Prior to 2007, the work had been carried out by the old Scottish Executive Environment and Rural Affairs Department (SEERAD).

See also
 Elin Jones Minister for Rural Affairs in Wales

References

External links
 Forestry Commission Scotland
 Scottish Government Senior Management Structure from 2007-2010 (pdf)

 
Directorates of the Scottish Government
Economy of Scotland
Climate change in Scotland
Scottish coast and countryside
Science and technology in Scotland
Environment of Scotland
2010 establishments in Scotland
Government agencies established in 2010
Environmental organisations based in Scotland
Forestry agencies in Scotland
Scotland